Choerospondias axillaris, known in English as the Nepali hog plum, is a tree in the family Anacardiaceae. It is a common fruit in Nepal and Bhutan, called lapsi and aamli in Nepali speaking community. It is native to Nepal. Its fruit is about 3 centimeters long and has a soft whitish sour flesh and green to yellow skin. The fruit is made into pickles, fruit tarts, and sour, spicy candy. The tree has long been cultivated for its fruit. The fruit is nutritious and has a price comparable to the mandarin orange on the Nepalese market.

This is a deciduous tree growing up to 20 meters tall. The smaller branches are purple-brown in color. The tree is dioecious, with male and female trees producing different types of inflorescence. Male flowers occur in long clusters and have curving, brown-veined petals about 3 millimeters long. Female flowers are solitary in leaf axils at the tips of branches. They are larger than the male flowers and yield the edible drupe. The fallen fruits are consumed and dispersed by sambar and barking deer. The fruit is used in religious ceremonies as well, as an offering.

Besides fruit, the tree yields valuable wood and hard seeds which are burned for fuel, and has parts used medicinally in Vietnam.

Catechin-7-O-glucoside can be found in the stem barks of C. axillaris.

Gallery

References

Anacardiaceae
Trees of China
Flora of the Indian subcontinent
Trees of Indo-China
Trees of Japan
Trees of Taiwan
Decorative fruits and seeds
Trees of Nepal
Dioecious plants